Super Ninja may refer to:

Wrestlers
Shunji Takano, in AWA, SCW, NCW, and WWE
Keiji Mutoh
Rip Oliver
Ron Reis, briefly known as Super Giant Ninja in WCW

Others
The Super Ninja, a 1984 film starring Alexander Lou
Super Ninja, a villain in the Chuck Norris: Karate Kommandos television series
“Super Ninja” the Ellipse Technical Admins AKA Amundson duo

See also
Super Ninja Boy, a computer game